Philippe Pierre de St. Sevin, dit l′Abbé cadet (1698–1777) was a French cellist.

Along with his older brother, Pierre Saint-Sevin, he was a music-master of the parish church of Agen in Aquitaine. It seems doubtful whether he was actually an ordained priest, or merely in consequence of his office had to wear the ecclesiastical dress, but from this situation he received the name l′Abbé cadet.

Later, both he and his brother gave up their connection with the church and went to Paris, where they obtained engagements at the Grand Opera.

Both Philippe and Pierre were excellent players, but Philippe seems to have been the more celebrated of the two, and to have been specially remarkable for his beautiful tone. It is said to have been owing in great measure to the impression produced by his playing that the viola da gamba more and more fell into disuse and the violoncello was more extensively introduced.

He was the father of the violinist Joseph-Barnabé Saint-Sevin, dit L′Abbé le Fils.

Notes

References
 

French classical cellists
1698 births
1777 deaths
18th-century classical musicians